The Hot Creek Range is a volcanic mountain range in Nye County, in central Nevada in the western United States.

To the west are Stone Cabin Valley, Little Fish Lake Valley, and the large Monitor Range.  To the east are Hot Creek Valley, Big Sand Springs Valley, and the Lunar Craters Volcanic Field.  Further east lies the large Railroad Valley, and the Grant and Quinn Canyon Ranges.  Highway 6 passes south of the range at 6293-foot (1918 m) Warm Springs Summit.  To the north, the range almost merges with the smaller Antelope and Park Ranges.

The northern section of the Hot Creek Range has two distinct crests.  The eastern crest rises to Morey Peak (10,246 feet, 3123 m), the highest point of the range.  Nearby is the historic silver mining district of Morey.  The western crest, across Sixmile Canyon, includes Mahogany Peak (9825 feet, 2995 m), Hot Creek Canyon, and the rugged Fandango Wilderness Study Area.

The range took its name from a nearby hot spring.

References

Further reading
Hiking the Great Basin, by John Hart

External links

 
 NevadaWilderness.org (Morey Peak WSA)
 NevadaWilderness.org (Fandango WSA)

Mountain ranges of Nevada
Mountain ranges of Nye County, Nevada
Mountain ranges of the Great Basin